The Bernafay Wood British Cemetery is a cemetery located in the Somme region of France commemorating British and Commonwealth soldiers who fought in the Battle of the Somme and against the German 1918 spring offensive in World War I. The cemetery contains mostly those who died between July 1916 and April 1917 and March–August 1918.

Location 
The cemetery is located near the village of Montauban-de-Picardie, approximately 10 kilometers east of the town of Albert, France. It is located on the D197 road approximately 2 kilometers south of the village of Longueval.

Fighting near Bernafay Wood 

On 1 July 1916, Montauban was captured by the British 30th and 18th Divisions. The heavily fortified Bois de Bernafay (Bernafay Wood) was taken by the 9th Scottish Division on 4 July 1916. Both the village and the wood were lost by the British in the German spring offensive of 1918, with the wood captured by the Germans in March–April 1918. However, the village was retaken by the 7th Buffs and 11th Royal Fusiliers of the 18th Division on 25 August and the wood by the 9th Scottish on the 27th.

Establishment of the Cemetery 
The cemetery was formally begun by an area dressing station in August 1916, with casualties beginning to be buried on 8 July. It was used as a front line cemetery until April 1917. The modern day cemetery was designed by Sir Herbert Baker and Arthur James Scott Hutton.

Statistics 
At the end of the war, the cemetery contained a total of 284 burials. After the reinterment of casualties from the Bernafay Wood North Cemetery and battlefields to the east of the wood, the cemetery now contains a total of 945 burials, of which 529 are identified and 417 are unidentified. Special memorials are dedicated to 11 British soldiers believed to be buried among the unknown and 12 soldiers whose Bernafay Wood North Cemetery graves were destroyed by shell fire.

References 

World War I cemeteries in France